"Set Fire To The Hive" is a song by the Australian progressive rock band Karnivool, released in April 2009 as the lead single from their second studio album, Sound Awake.

Background
The song was debuted live at the Aeons Tour in 2008, was confirmed to be the first single on the band's MySpace  and was released on 28 April 2009. The earlier-confirmed music video  was released on 8 May 2009 and has received significant airplay on both Channel V and radio station Triple J.

The song peaked at #11 on the AIR Top 20 singles charts.

The song, musically, is substantially different from Karnivool's previous work. The song has been described as the 'black sheep' of the album, with guitarist, Drew Goddard acknowledging as much. 

In an interview bassist Jon Stockman describes the song as being

Music video
The music video for the song was released on YouTube on 8 May 2009 eleven days after the song's release on the band's MySpace profile.

The music video features the band playing in what appears to be a cube. To match with the first line, "I don't know what's wrong, but I'm on fire", Ian Kenny's arm is on fire. With the first lyrics of the verse, "We're slaves, in this medicated cage", A bird cage appears on Ian Kenny's head.

Track listings

Digital single
 "Set Fire To The Hive" (I. Kenny, M. Hosking, A. Goddard, J. Stockman, S. Judd) - 4:29

EP
 "Set Fire to the Hive" - 4:26
 "Themata" - 5:46
 "Roquefort" (with Empire Horns) - 4:48
 "Deadman" (Live at The Forum) - 10:37

References 

Karnivool songs
2009 songs